Five ships of the Royal Navy have been named HMS Tulip or Tulip:

 English ship Tulip (1652), a 32-gun ship captured in 1652 and sold in 1657
 English ship Tulip (1672), a 2-gun sloop built in 1672 and lost in 1673
 English ship Tulip (1672), a 6-gun dogger captured in 1672 and sold the same year
 , an  sloop
 , a 

Royal Navy ship names